Raoul Maximiano Trujillo de Chauvelon (born May 8, 1955) is an American and Canadian actor, dancer, choreographer, and theatre director. A former soloist with the Nikolais Dance Theatre, he is the original choreographer and co-director for the American Indian Dance Theatre. Trujillo's career spans more than 45 years in film, television, and theatre, as well as hosting a series of dancing programs. He is a Critics' Choice Award nominee.

Trujillo is best known for playing Zero Wolf, a ruthless Mayan slave catcher and the main antagonist of Mel Gibson's Apocalypto (2006), and for playing the Iroquois chief Kiotseaton in the film Black Robe. He has appeared in numerous high-profile and acclaimed films, including The New World, Cowboys and Aliens, Riddick, Blood Father, Sicario, and its sequel Sicario: Day of the Soldado. He also starred in dozens of television programs in both supporting and starring roles, including True Blood, Lost Girl, Da Vinci's Demons, Salem, The Blacklist, and Jamestown. He currently stars on Mayans M.C. as Che "Taza" Romero.

Early life 

Trujillo was born and raised in Española and Los Alamos, New Mexico. After high school, he spent three years serving in the United States Army in Germany. After his discharge, he worked as an alpine ski instructor in Taos, New Mexico. He left the world of professional skiing after traveling extensively through Mexico, Central and South America on his way to teach in Bariloche, Argentina.

Career 
He started work in the theatre as a scenic painter and landed his first job in 1977 as an actor/dancer in a production of Equus. He began dancing in Los Angeles in 1978 at the University of Southern California and saw his first modern dance and ballet productions; Pilobolus, Martha Graham and Rudolf Nureyev. The next two years, he trained extensively with the Toronto Dance Theatre and Nikolais/Louis Dance Lab in New York City on scholarships. He was asked to join Nikolais Dance Theatre under the direction of the master Alwin Nikolais, who became his mentor and he began touring the world. He also learned scenic, costume and lighting design during this time from 1980 to 1987. After leaving the company, he began his solo work as dancer and choreographer and commenced his journey into shamanic ceremonials and incorporating native myths and legends in his work.

After the first decade of performing as a dancer, he became the choreographer and co-director for the American Indian Dance Theatre, the first professional native dance company incorporating traditional dance with contemporary retelling of myths and legends. He choreographed, "The Shaman's Journey", for the Asia Society in New York and later was adapted into a short film for PBS on Alive from Off Center. He went on to join creative partners Alejandro Roncerria and René Highway in Toronto. This work resulted in creating successful theatre pieces for Native Earth Performing Arts. His work with Alejandro continued and he helped establish the Aboriginal Dance Project at the Banff Centre to further train Indigenous dancers from all over the world. In 2002, he received the CANCOM Ross Charles award in Canada to attend the Banff Center's screenwriters workshop for aboriginal storytellers.

Trujilo began his screen acting career in 1988 in Canada, and currently holds over 107 film and television credits. He choreographed the dances, ceremonies and rituals for Terrence Malick's The New World, as well as acting in the role of Tomocomo.

Filmography

Film

Television

As himself
Chiefs (TV mini-series documentary) (2002)
Making 'The New World''' (video documentary) - Himself (2006)Becoming Mayan: Creating Apocalypto (video documentary short) - Himself (2006)Beyond the Yellow Brick Road: The Making of Tin Man (TV documentary) - Himself (2007)Wild Horses and Renegades'' (documentary) - as Speaker (2007)

References

External links
 Official site
 

1955 births
Living people
Ute people
Male actors from New Mexico
Actors from Santa Fe, New Mexico
Place of birth missing (living people)
20th-century American male actors
21st-century American male actors
American male film actors
American male television actors
American expatriate actors in Canada
20th-century Native Americans
21st-century Native Americans
Native American actors